This is a list of airlines currently operating in Montserrat.

See also
 List of airlines
 List of defunct airlines of Montserrat

Airlines
Montserrat
Montserrat
Airlines